Miroslav L Djordjevic (Serbian spelling: Miroslav Đorđević) is a Serbian surgeon specializing in sex reassignment surgery, and an assistant professor of urology at the School of Medicine, University of Belgrade, Serbia.

Early life and education
Djordjevic completed his medical studies, including his urology residency, at the University of Belgrade's School of Medicine, in Serbia, in 1991. His PhD thesis, completed in 2003, was titled "A New Approach for Surgical Treatment of Peyronie's Disease".

Career
Djordjevic works in the field of genital reconstructive surgery, and he is willing to treat all anomalies of the genital system regardless of gender or age. He is the founder and leader of the Belgrade Center for Genital Reconstructive Surgery.

Djordjevic has published many papers on the surgical treatment of hypospadias, epispadias, Peyronie's disease, adult hypospadias, buried penis, urethral reconstruction, pediatric reconstructive urology, and penile enhancement surgery, as well as transgender surgery.

Since 1999, Djordjevic has been a professor of surgery at the Medical School of Belgrade University. Since 2013, he has been a member of the Academy of Serbian Medical Association.

In 2008, Djordjevic jointly authored a paper titled Transsexualism in Serbia: A Twenty-Year Follow-Up Study. 

Serbia has become a centre for transgender surgery, in part due to the work of Djordjevic, with candidates coming from France, Iran, India, the United States, South Africa, Singapore, and Australia.

Djordjevic has reported that some people regret having undergone gender confirmation procedures, and that many come to him seeking surgical help in detransition. He says this is particularly so for male-to-female patients over the age of 30. His views on this are discussed in detail in a 2018 interview by Mark Hughes of the Pulling the Trigger podcast.

He works on his project to develop a technique to transplant penis, testicles, uterine for transgender. He is optimistic that transplantation of genitalia will eventually become standard.

In 2023, he successfully transplanted ovary, making Serbia the second country in the world to do so.

Publications

Books 
 Perovic, SV; Djordjevic, ML: "Reconstrucao Peniana: Tecnica de Separacao do Penis Como uma Nova Abordagem a Reconstrucao Cirurgica do Orgao", Disfuncao Sexual: Teloken, C; Da Ros, CT; Tannhauser, M (eds.): Revinter, Ltda; Rio de Janeiro; 2003. pp. 192–199. 
 Djordjevic, ML: "Sexual Reassignment Surgery: Male to Female", Aesthetic and Functional Surgery of the Genitalia: Salgado, CJ; Redett R (eds.): Nova Publishers; New York; 2014. 
 Djordjevic, ML: "Hypospadias Surgery: Challenges and Limits", Hauppauge: Nova Science Publishers, Inc.; New York.

Selected journal articles

See also 

 List of transgender-related topics
 Transgender health care
 Transitioning (transgender)

References

 

1965 births
Living people
Serbian urologists
Surgeons specializing in transgender medicine
University of Belgrade Faculty of Medicine alumni